David Attwood is an American physicist and professor emeritus at the University of California, Berkeley, where he worked in the field of synchrotron radiation and free-electron lasers, developing X-ray microscopy techniques for research and for the industry (EUV lithography). He is the author of a reference book on soft X-rays and extreme ultraviolet radiation.

Education and career 
David Attwood received his Ph.D. in Applied Physics from New York University in 1972. After his Ph.D, he joined Lawrence Livermore National Laboratory to work on laser fusion. 
He was the first scientific director of the Advanced Light Source (1985–1988) and the founding director of the Center for X-Ray Optics at Lawrence Berkeley National Laboratory, where he pioneered EUV lithography. He co-founded the  Applied Science and Technology (AS&T) program within the college of engineering at UC Berkeley and supervised over twenty grad students, among who Regina Soufli and Anne Sakdinawat. 
He is a Fellow of the American Physical Society.

References

External links

1941 births
Living people
American physicists
UC Berkeley College of Engineering faculty
New York University alumni
Fellows of the American Physical Society